Douglas Crockford is an American computer programmer  who is involved in the development of the JavaScript language. He specified the data format JSON (JavaScript Object Notation), and has developed various JavaScript related tools such as the static code analyzer JSLint and minifier JSMin. Of his books, "JavaScript: The Good Parts" was published in 2008, followed by "How JavaScript Works" in 2018.  He was a senior JavaScript architect at PayPal until 2019, and is also a writer and speaker on JavaScript, JSON, and related web technologies.

Education 
Crockford earned a degree in Radio and Television from San Francisco State University in 1975. He took classes in FORTRAN and worked with a university lab's computer.

Career 
Crockford purchased an Atari 8-bit computer in 1980 and wrote the game Galahad and the Holy Grail for the Atari Program Exchange (APX), which resulted in Chris Crawford hiring him at Atari, Inc. While at Atari, Crockford wrote another game, Burgers!, for APX and a number of experimental audio/visual demos that were freely distributed.

After Warner Communications sold the company, he joined National Semiconductor. In 1984 Crockford joined Lucasfilm, and later Paramount Pictures. He became known on video game oriented listservs in the early 1990s after he posted his memoir "The Expurgation of Maniac Mansion" to a videogaming bulletin board. The memoir documented his efforts to censor the computer game Maniac Mansion to Nintendo's satisfaction so that they could release it as a cartridge, and Crockford's mounting frustrations as Nintendo's demands became more obscure and confusing.

Together with Randy Farmer and Chip Morningstar, Crockford founded Electric Communities and was its CEO from 1994 to 1995. He was involved in the development of the programming language E.

Crockford was the founder of State Software (also known as Veil Networks) and its CTO from 2001 to 2002.

During his time at State Software, Crockford popularized the JSON data format, based upon existing JavaScript language constructs, as a lightweight alternative to XML. He obtained the domain name json.org in 2002, and put up his description of the format there. In July 2006, he specified the format officially, as RFC 4627.

He worked at Yahoo for many years.

Opinions on Javascript 

In 2008 Crockford published a book announcing his discovery that Javascript, contrary to prevailing opinion, has good parts.  He describes this as "heresy", and as "possibly the first important discovery of the 21st century", noting that it came as a "great surprise to the community of javascript developers, and to the world at large."  He attributes the discovery to his having read the ECMAScript Standard, which he says "literally changed my life."  He also notes that the specification document is of "extremely poor quality", "hard to read", "hard to understand", and says that the ECMA and the TC39 committee "should be deeply embarrassed".

Software license for "Good, not Evil" 

In 2002, in reference to President George Bush's war on "evildoers", Crockford started releasing his JSMin software under a customized open source MIT License, with the added the requirement that "The Software shall be used for Good, not Evil". This clause was carried over to JSMin-PHP, a variation of JSMin by Ryan Grove. This software was hosted on Google Code until December 2009 when, due to the additional clause, Google determined that the license was not compliant with the definition of free and open source software, which does not permit any restriction on how software may be used.  JSMin-PHP was forced to migrate to a new hosting provider.  According to the GNU project, the licence conflicts with Freedom 0 of the Free Software definition, and although "it may be unenforceable, we cannot presume that", therefore non-free.

Crockford's license has caused problems for some open source projects who mistook the license for an open source variant of the MIT license. Affected open source developers have asked Crockford to change the license, but he has continued to use it.

In media
Crockford is listed in the acknowledgements of the 1995 hardcover edition of The Diamond Age, by Neal Stephenson as Douglas (Carl Hollywood) Crockford.

Bibliography

References

External links 

 

Living people
American computer programmers
Atari people
Web developers
San Francisco State University alumni
People associated with JavaScript
Lucasfilm people
PayPal people
Year of birth missing (living people)